Zanjireh Rural District is a rural district (dehestan) in the Shabab District of Chardavol County, Ilam Province, Iran. At the 2006 census, its population was 3,584, in 752 families.  The rural district has 5 villages.

References 

Rural Districts of Ilam Province
Chardavol County